The Old Colony Street Railway Company (Old Colony St. Ry.) was a horse-drawn and electric streetcar railroad operated on the streets of Boston, Massachusetts and communities south of the city. Founded in 1881 as the Brockton Street Railway Company, via lease and merger it became a primary mass transit provider for southeastern Massachusetts and Rhode Island.  Its immediate successor was the Bay State Street Railway, and its modern successor is the state-run Massachusetts Bay Transportation Authority (MBTA).

Founding
The Old Colony Street Railway Company began operations on July 5, 1881 as the Brockton Street Railway Company (Brockton St. Ry.) The corporate name of the company was changed to Old Colony on February 7, 1901. All of the below listed street railway companies eventually became part of the Bay State Street Railway (Bay State), later absorbed by the Eastern Massachusetts Street Railway (Eastern Mass), in 1919.  Eastern Mass was acquired by the Massachusetts Bay Transportation Authority (MBTA) in 1968.

Mergers and acquisitions
The following companies were purchased and merged with the Brockton Street Railway Company:

 Boston, Milton & Brockton Street Railway CompanyCorporate office: Quincybegan operations on July 11, 1899, sold February 10, 1900 to Brockton St. Ry. and consolidated
 Brockton, Bridgewater & Taunton Street Railway CompanyCorporate office: Bridgewatercommenced operations June 14, 1897, sold in February 10, 1900 to Brockton St. Ry. and consolidated
 Brockton & East Bridgewater Street Railway CompanyCorporate office: Bridgewatercommenced operations July 3, 1897, sold February 10, 1900 to Brockton St. Ry. and consolidated
 Brockton & Holbrook Street Railway CompanyCorporate office: Brocktoncommenced operations on September 19, 1892; leased to Brockton St. Ry. Co. on April 1, 1893; purchased by Brockton St. Ry. Co. on September 17, 1894
 Brockton & Stoughton Street Railway CompanyCorporate office: BostonIncorporated 1894, sold June 11, 1895 to Brockton St. Ry. Co. prior to starting operations.
 East Side Street Railway CompanyCorporate office: Brocktoncommenced operations on November 1, 1888; leased to Brockton St. Ry. Co. on October 1, 1892; purchased by Brockton St. Ry. Co. on September 17, 1894
 Globe Street Railway Company (Globe St. Ry.)Corporate office: Fall River incorporated April 16, 1880; merged on January 19, 1901 with the Brockton St. Ry.
 Fall River Street Railway CompanyCorporate office: Fall River incorporated 1895; begun operations May 28, 1896; sold April 30,1898 to Globe St. Ry. and consolidated
 Dighton, Somerset & Swansea Street Railway CompanyCorporate office: Tauntonincorporated 1895; started operating July 8, 1895; sold and consolidated with Globe St. Ry. April 24, 1900
 Taunton Street Railway Company incorporated 1871, sold 1901 to Globe St. Ry.
 Providence & Taunton Street Railway Company incorporated 1898, sold in 1900 to Taunton Street Railway
 New Bedford, Middleborough & Brockton Street Railway Company sold in 1900 to Brockton St. Ry. and consolidated
 Quincy & Boston Street Railway Company incorporated 1889, sold in 1900 to Brockton St. Ry. and consolidated
 Quincy Street Railwayincorporated 1888, leased 1889 to Quincy & Boston Street Railway, sold 1895 to Quincy & Boston Street Railway
 Braintree Street Railwayincorporated 1893, leased 1895 to Quincy & Boston Street Railway, sold 1899 to Quincy & Boston Street Railway
 Randolph Street Railwaysold 1897 to Braintree Street Railway.
 South Shore & Boston Street Railway CompanyCorporate office: Quincy incorporated in 1894 as the Hanover Street Railway Company (headquartered in Rockland); named changed July 15, 1899; sold in November 21, 1900 to Brockton St. Ry. and consolidated
 Braintree & Weymouth Street Railway Company incorporated 1891, merged July 15, 1899 with Hanover St. Ry.
 Bridgewater Whitman & Rockland Street Railway CompanyIncorporated 1897, merged July 15, 1899 with Hanover St. Ry.
 Hingham Street Railway Company incorporated 1895, merged July 15, 1899 with Hanover
 Hull Street Railway Companyincorporated 1887, sold 1898 to Hingham Street Railway.
 Nantasket Electric Street Railway Companysold 1898 to Hingham Street Railway.
 Rockland & Abington Street Railway Companyincorporated 1892, merged July 15, 1899 with Hanover
 Taunton & Brockton Street Railway CompanyCorporate office: Brocktonincorporated in 1896; sold in February 10, 1900 to Brockton St. Ry. and consolidated
 West Roxbury & Roslindale Street Railway Company (WR&R)was incorporated in 1896, and merged on December 22, 1900 with Brockton St. Ry.
 Needham & Boston Street Railway Companysold 1900 to WR&R.
 Norfolk Central Street Railway CompanyCorporate office: Dedham)incorporated 1896, sold 1899 to WR&R and consolidated. (Opened Westwood Park)
 Norfolk Suburban Street Railway Company Corporate office: Dedhamincorporated 1893- sold 1900 to WR&R.
 Norfolk Street Railway Company incorporated 1889, sold 1892 to Norfolk Suburban.
 Whitman Street Railway Companyleased to Brockton St. Ry. Co. on April 1, 1892; purchased by Brockton St. Ry. Co. on September 17, 1894

Additional acquisitions by Old Colony
The Old Colony St. Ry. also later acquired the following street railway companies:
 Newport & Fall River Street Railway Companyincorporated 1898, leased 1901 to OC.
 Taunton & Pawtucket Street Railway Companyincorporated 1904, sold to OC.
 Bristol County Street Railway Company incorporated 1899, sold 1904 to Taunton & Pawtucket Street Railway.

Purchase and consolidation
The Old Colony St. Ry. was purchased by and consolidated with the Boston and Northern Street Railway on July 1, 1911. The B&N was renamed the Bay State on August 8, 1911, and the Bay State was acquired by Eastern Massachusetts Street Railway Company on January 15, 1919.
. Eastern Mass was purchased by the MBTA in 1968.

Communities served

The following cities and towns in Massachusetts and Rhode Island were serviced by the Old Colony:

 Abington
 Avon
 Braintree
 Bridgewater
 Brockton
 Boston
 Dedham
 Dighton
 Easton
 East Bridgewater
 Fall River
 Freetown
 Hanover
 Hingham
 Holbrook
 Hull
 Hyde Park
 Lakeville
 Milton
 Middleboro
 Middleton
 Needham
 New Bedford
 Newport
 Norwell
 Norwood
 Portsmouth
 Quincy
 Randolph
 Rehoboth
 Raynham
 Rockland
 Seekonk
 Somerset
 Stoughton
 Taunton
 Tiverton
 Taunton
 Westwood
 West Bridgewater
 Weymouth
 Whitman

References

Streetcars in the Boston area
Interurban railways in Massachusetts
Defunct Massachusetts railroads
Public transportation in the Boston area
Tram, urban railway and trolley companies
Defunct companies based in Massachusetts
1881 establishments in Massachusetts
Railway companies disestablished in 1911
Railway companies established in 1881
Transportation in Plymouth County, Massachusetts
American companies established in 1881
Rail transportation in Boston